Thunder Bay has 38 elementary schools, 3 middle schools, 5 secondary schools, 2 private schools, a university, two colleges, a medical school, and an adult education facility. The school boards offer education programmes for people with special needs or who are in trouble with the law, as well as night school. The city also has several other private for-profit colleges and tutoring programmes.

School boards 

The main school boards serving the Thunder Bay area are the Lakehead District School Board, the Thunder Bay Catholic District School Board, and the Conseil scolaire de district catholique des Aurores boréales. 

The Lakehead District School Board is the largest, with 22 elementary schools, 3 secondary schools and a centre for adult studies. The Thunder Bay Catholic District School Board is the second largest with 16 elementary schools, 3 middle schools and 2 high schools. CSDC Aurores boréales operates one elementary and one high school in Thunder Bay, and an additional six schools throughout the Thunder Bay District.

List of Schools 

Public Elementary Schools

Algonquin Avenue Public School
Armstrong Public School (Armstrong)
Bernier-Stokes Public School (Collins)
C.D. Howe Public School
Claude E. Garton Public School (French Immersion)
Crestview Public School (Murillo)
École Elsie MacGill Public School
Ecole Gron Morgan Public School (French Immersion)
Five Mile Public School
Gorham and Ware Public School (Gorham and Ware)
Kakabeka Falls Public School (Kakabeka Falls)
Kingsway Park Public School 
McKellar Park Public School
McKenzie Public School (Shuniah)(K-6)
Nor'wester View Public School
Ogden Community Public School (K-6)
St. James Public School (K-6)
Sherbrooke Public School
Valley Central Public School
Vance Chapman Public School
Westmount Public School
Whitefish Valley Public School (Whitefish Valley)
Woodcrest Public School
Public Secondary Schools
Hammarskjold High School (French Immersion)
Superior Collegiate and Vocational Institute (IB)
Westgate Collegiate & Vocational Institute (7 to 12)
Adult Education
Lakehead Adult Education Centre

Catholic K-6 Schools
Corpus Christi
Holy Cross
Holy Family
Our Lady Of Charity
St. Ann
St. Bernard (French Immersion)
St. Elizabeth
St. Francis
St. Jude
St. Margaret
St. Martin
St. Paul
St. Pius X
St. Thomas Aquinas
St. Vincent
Catholic 7/8 Schools
Bishop E. Q. Jennings
Bishop Gallagher
Pope John Paul II
Catholic Secondary Schools
St. Ignatius (French Immersion)
St. Patrick (French Immersion)
CSDC Aurores Boréales
École Catholique Franco-Supérior (K-6)
École secondaire catholique de la Vérendrye (7 to 12)
Private Schools
Dennis Franklin Cromarty High School (Official Site)(9 to 12)
Thunder Bay Christian School (Official Site)(K-10)(CSI)

Post-Secondary Institutions 

Confederation College
Aviation Centre of Excellence
Negahneewin College

Lakehead University
Northern Ontario School of Medicine

For-Profit Institutions 

Everest College (closed)
Kumon Canada
Sylvan Learning Centre

See also
List of school districts in Ontario
List of high schools in Ontario

References

External links 

 Lakehead Board of Education
 Thunder Bay Catholic District School Board
  CSDC des Aurores boréales 

 Thunder Bay Christian School
 Dennis Franklin Cromarty High School
 Keewaytinook Internet High School
 Contact North

